The Pirates of the Caribbean franchise is a fantasy-adventure film series consisting of The Curse of the Black Pearl (2003), Dead Man's Chest (2006), At World's End (2007), On Stranger Tides (2011) and Dead Men Tell No Tales (2017). The first three films were directed by Gore Verbinski, while the fourth was by Rob Marshall; the series was written by Ted Elliott and Terry Rossio, produced by Jerry Bruckheimer and distributed by Walt Disney Pictures. The Pirates films have featured such characters as Captain Jack Sparrow (Johnny Depp), Will Turner (Orlando Bloom), Elizabeth Swann (Keira Knightley), Captain Hector Barbossa (Geoffrey Rush), Joshamee Gibbs (Kevin McNally), Davy Jones (Bill Nighy), Angelica (Penélope Cruz), Blackbeard (Ian McShane), Philip Swift (Sam Claflin) and Syrena (Àstrid Bergès-Frisbey). Hans Zimmer composed the score primarily, although Klaus Badelt composed for the first film.

The Curse of the Black Pearl was 2003's fourth highest-grossing film worldwide (behind The Lord of the Rings: The Return of the King, Finding Nemo and The Matrix Reloaded). Dead Man's Chest was 2006's highest-grossing film worldwide, and the sixth highest-grossing film of all time (originally third), behind Avatar, Titanic, Harry Potter and the Deathly Hallows – Part 2, Transformers: Dark of the Moon and The Lord of the Rings: The Return of the King. At World's End was 2007's highest-grossing film worldwide and the twelfth highest ever (originally sixth), and On Stranger Tides was 2011's third highest-grossing film and is the twelfth highest-grossing film of all time worldwide.

Pirates of the Caribbean has received reviews ranging from positive to negative. The Curse of the Black Pearl received 78% positive reviews of 197 sampled critics on review aggregate Rotten Tomatoes and garnered an average rating of 7.1/10. Dead Man's Chest received a 54% "Rotten" rating on Rotten Tomatoes. At World's End has a "Rotten" rating of 45% on Rotten Tomatoes and 50% at Metacritic, although opinions differed from positive to negative. On Stranger Tides has received generally mixed reviews. Rotten Tomatoes reports that 33% of critics have given the film a positive review based on 232 reviews, with an average score of 5/10.

It has won a plethora of prestigious awards and has gathered 11 Academy Award nominations (five for The Curse of the Black Pearl, four for Dead Man's Chest and two for At World's End), with one win for Best Visual Effects in 2006 for Dead Man's Chest. Pirates has also won two BAFTA awards, 17 Teen Choice Awards, and has been nominated for two Golden Globes, two Eddie awards (winning one), one Grammy, nine MTV Movie Awards (winning four), 17 Saturn Awards (winning four), seven Satellites (winning one) and two Artios Awards.

The Curse of the Black Pearl

The franchise's first film, Pirates of the Caribbean: The Curse of the Black Pearl, was released in 2003 to a high gross, and positive reviews, with Empire magazine claiming it to be "the best blockbuster of the summer" and Roger Ebert praising Johnny Depp's performance for its "originality". It was directed by Gore Verbinski and produced by Jerry Bruckheimer. The story follows a blacksmith, Will Turner, (Orlando Bloom) and a pirate, Captain Jack Sparrow (Johnny Depp), as they rescue a kidnapped Elizabeth Swann (Keira Knightley) from the cursed crew of the Black Pearl, captained by Hector Barbossa (Geoffrey Rush).

It was nominated for five Academy Awards, but did not win in any of its categories. It was also nominated for five BAFTA Awards (winning one), five Empire Awards (winning one), one Golden Globe, three Golden Reel Awards (winning one), six MTV Movie Awards (winning one), five Online Film Critics Society Awards, eight Phoenix Film Critics Society Awards, six Satellite Awards, 11 Saturn Awards (winning one), five Teen Choice Awards (winning four), eight Visual Effects Society Award (winning two) and two Washington DC Area Film Critics Association Awards (winning one), with multiple other awards.

Dead Man's Chest

The franchise's second film, Pirates of the Caribbean: Dead Man's Chest was released in 2006 to a high gross of over $1 billion, but received mixed reviews, with BBC critic Paul Arendt negatively comparing it to The Matrix Reloaded, as "a complex film that merely led onto the next film" but Michael Booth of The Denver Post called it "two hours and 20 minutes of escapism that once again makes the movies safe for guilt-free fun." It was directed by Gore Verbinski, written by Ted Elliott and Terry Rossio, and produced by Jerry Bruckheimer. It was shot back-to-back with the franchise's third film, Pirates of the Caribbean: At World's End. The film's plot follows Captain Jack Sparrow (Johnny Depp) as he discovers his debt to Davy Jones (Bill Nighy) is due, and the marriage of Will Turner (Orlando Bloom) and Elizabeth Swann (Keira Knightley) is interrupted by Lord Cutler Beckett (Tom Hollander), who wants Turner to acquire Sparrow's compass.

It received four Academy Award nominations, of which it won one for Best Visual Effects. It was also nominated for five BAFTA Awards (winning one), one Eddie Award, four Empire Awards, one Golden Globe Award for Best Actor in a Motion Picture Musical or Comedy for Johnny Depp, one Grammy Award, three Kids' Choice Awards (winning one), four MTV Movie Awards (winning two), five Saturn Awards (winning one), 10 Teen Choice Awards (winning seven) and won all three People's Choice Award nominations, six Visual Effects Society Awards and a Satellite Award.

At World's End

The franchise's third film, At World's End, similarly to Dead Man's Chest, received a high gross, but mixed reviews, with Total Film magazine praising the performances but complaining that the "twists and exposition made it hard to care for the characters," and James Berardinelli found it to be the weakest of the trilogy as "the last hour offers adventure as rousing as anything provided in either of the previous installments... which doesn't account for the other 108 minutes of this gorged, self-indulgent, and uneven production." Gore Verbinski directed the film and the script was written by Ted Elliott and Terry Rossio. The plot follows Will Turner, Elizabeth Swann, and the crew of the Black Pearl rescuing Captain Jack Sparrow (Johnny Depp), from Davy Jones's Locker, and then preparing to fight the East India Trading Company, led by Cutler Beckett (Tom Hollander) and Davy Jones (Bill Nighy), who plan to extinguish piracy.

It was nominated for two Academy Awards, of which it won neither. It was also nominated for a BAFTA Award, a Costume Designers Guild Award, an Eddie Award, three Kids' Choice Awards (winning one), three MTV Movie Awards (winning one), four National Movie Awards, four Saturn Awards (winning one), one Screen Actors Guild Award, six Teen Choice Awards (winning five), seven Visual Effects Society Awards (winning two), and won two People's Choice Awards.

: George Marshall Ruge, Tsuyoshi Abe, Kevin Abercrombie, Joey Anaya, Tony Angelotti, Greg Anthony, Noby Arden, Sala Baker, Daniel W. Barringer, Brian Bennett, Richard L. Blackwell, Ben Bray, Dan Brown, Joe Bucaro III, Richard Bucher, Keith Campbell, Jay Caputo, Darryl Chan, Alex Chansky, Eric Chen, Fernando Chien, Ilram Choi, Arnold Chon, Brian Patrick Collins, Geovanny Corvera, Brycen Counts, Shawn Crowder, Phil Culotta, Mark De Alessandro, John Dixon, J. Mark Donaldson, John Donohue, Brian Duffy, Jayson Dumenigo, Thomas DuPont, Andy Dylan, Greg Wayne Elam, Kofi Elam, Paul Eliopoulos, Robert Elmore, Masaaki Endo, Jonathan Eusebio, Roel Failma, Dane Farwell, Jeremy Fry, Darin Fujimori, Richie Gaona, Mickey Giacomazzi, Erica Grace, Dean Grimes, Charles Grisham, Al Goto, Sam Hargrave, Zac Henry, Steven Ho, Lisa Hoyle, Randall Huber, Zach Hudson, Alex Huynh, Yoshio Iizuka, Keii Johnston, John Koyama, Anthony Kramme, Theo Kypri, Reuben Langdon, Danny Le Boyer, Don Lee, Michelle Lee, Will Leong, Christopher Leps, James Lew, Michael Li, Sam Looc, Kurt D. Lott, Ray Lykins, Rob Mars, Kirk Maxwell, Mark McDaniels, Lee McDermott, Angela Meryl, Norman Mora, Tom Morga, Marty Murray, Tadahiro Nakamura, Mark Norby, Phi-Long Nguyen, Hugh Aodh O'Brien, Casey O'Neill, Lin Oeding, Brad Orrison, Jen Sung Outerbridge, Jim Palmer, Norb Phillips, Víctor Quintero, Denney Pierce, J.P. Romano, Thomas Rosales Jr., Bill M. Ryusaki, Gregg Sargeant, Liane Schmidt, Marc Schaffer, Craig Frosty Silva, Lincoln Simonds, Buddy Sosthand, Gary Ray Stearns, Jim Stephan, Don Tai, Lewis Tan, Philip Tan, Steve Tartalia, Bryan Thompson, Trampas Thompson, Aaron Toney, Russell Towery, Steve Upton, Xuyen Valdivia, Jon Valera, Mark Vanselow, David Wald, Mike Watson, Ryan Watson, Jack West, Webster Whinery, Webster P. Whinery Jr., Brian J. Williams, Jeff Wolfe, Adrienne Wong, Kerry Wong, Phillip Wong, Emily Wu, Kofi Yiadom, Marcus Young

On Stranger Tides
The franchise's fourth film, On Stranger Tides received a high gross, but mixed reviews, with Mark Kermode giving the film an overwhelmingly negative review on his 5 Live show, saying "it's not as staggeringly misjudged as the third part, because it is just nothing, it is just a big empty nothing". However, Box Office Magazine's Pete Hammond called it "The Best Pirate Outing Yet!" and praised the director for bringing "an almost lyrical grace to the mayhem". It was directed by Rob Marshall, written by Ted Elliott and Terry Rossio, and produced by Jerry Bruckheimer. In the film, Captain Jack Sparrow (Johnny Depp) is joined by Angelica (Penélope Cruz) in his search for the Fountain of Youth, confronting the infamous pirate Blackbeard (Ian McShane).

Dead Men Tell No Tales

References
 General

 
 
 
 
  

 Specific

External links
 
 
 
 
 

Pirates Of The Caribbean Accolades
Pirates of the Caribbean
Accolades